Dipterocarpus coriaceus is a species of tree in the family Dipterocarpaceae endemic to Kalimantan, Sumatra and peninsular Malaysia. This very large tree occurs in mixed dipterocarp forests on hillsides and undulating land. This species was reported in the New Straits Times to be extinct in Peninsular Malaysia in July 2013 as its last natural habitat in Bikam Forest Reserve in Perak was de-gazetted and cleared for oil palm cultivation.

References

 

coriaceus
Trees of Sumatra
Trees of Peninsular Malaysia
Trees of Borneo
Critically endangered flora of Asia